The 1949 Dartmouth Indians football team represented Dartmouth College during the 1949 college football season.

Schedule

References

Dartmouth
Dartmouth Big Green football seasons
Dartmouth Indians football